Idol 2013 was the Swedish Idol series' ninth season which premiered on August 19, 2013. and ended on December 6, 2013. In January 2013, TV4 confirmed that the Idol series would be returning after a year's hiatus after Idol 2011.

The contestants included professional footballer Kevin Walker, who played in the Swedish second division for GIF Sundsvall. A few of Walker's matches with the team were moved to avoid a clash with his television commitments.

Winner of season nine was Kevin Walker.

Elimination Chart 
The diagram shows how each participant placed during the qualifying week and the weekly finals.

References

2013 Swedish television seasons
Season 09
2013 in Swedish music